Sheykh Hozur (also Romanized as Sheykh Ḩoẕūr, Sheikh Hozoor, and Sheykh ’ozūr) is a village in Fatuyeh Rural District, in the Central District of Bastak County, Hormozgan Province, Iran. At the 2006 census, its population was 440, in 93 families.

References 

Populated places in Bastak County